Dana Blatt de Goddzer is a fictional character in the 2012 Argentine telenovela Graduados. She is played by Mirta Busnelli.

Awards
Misrta Busnelli has been nominated to the 2012 Tato Awards and Martín Fierro Awards for her work with the character.

References

Graduados characters
Fictional Argentine Jews
Fictional Jewish women
Television characters introduced in 2012